The Gleirschbach is a river of Tyrol, Austria, a tributary of the Isar.

The Gleirschbach originates north of the alpine hut Pfeishütte. It has a length of app. ,  of these on the city area of Innsbruck. 
At the exit of the Hinterau valley the Gleirschbach merges with the Isar. The water possesses A grade quality and is popular among rafting-fans.

Rivers of Tyrol (state)
Rivers of Austria